Henry Pyne may refer to:

Henry Pyne (MP for Liskeard) (1504/5-1556 or later), Member of English Parliament
Henry Pyne (MP for Dungarvan) (before 1688 - 1713), Member of Irish Parliament

See also
William Henry Pyne (1796-1843), artist
Henry's Pine, species of conifer